In materials science, disappearing polymorphs (or perverse polymorphism) describes a phenomenon in which a seemingly stable crystal structure is suddenly unable to be produced, instead transforming into a polymorph, or differing crystal structure with the same chemical composition, during nucleation. Sometimes the resulting transformation is extremely hard or impractical to reverse, because the new polymorph may be more stable. It is hypothesized that contact with a single microscopic seed crystal of the new polymorph can be enough to start a chain reaction causing the transformation of a much larger mass of material. Widespread contamination with such microscopic seed crystals may lead to the impression that the original polymorph has "disappeared."

This is of concern to both the pharmaceutical and computer hardware industry, where disappearing polymorphs can ruin the effectiveness of their products, and make it impossible to manufacture the original product if there is any contamination. There have been cases of laboratories growing crystals of a particular structure and when they try to recreate this, the original crystal structure isn't created but a new crystal structure is. The drug paroxetine was subject to a lawsuit that hinged on such a pair of polymorphs, and multiple life-saving drugs, such as ritonavir, have been recalled due to unexpected polymorphism. Although it may seem like a so-called disappearing polymorph has disappeared for good, it is believed that it is always possible in principle to reconstruct the original polymorph, though doing so may be impractically difficult.  Disappearing polymorphs are generally metastable forms, that are replaced by a more stable form.

It is hypothesized that "unintentional seeding" may also be responsible for the phenomenon in which it often becomes easier to crystallize synthetic compounds over time.

Pharmaceutical, legal, and industrial impact

Paroxetine 
In 1985, the scientist Alan Curzons, who was working for the pharmaceutical company GSK (GlaxoSmithKline at the time), discovered that the drug paroxetine, a potent SSRI which didn't react well with moisture, exhibited polymorphism, and could be transformed into a far more stable and less reactive form. The stable form, paroxetine hemihydrate, needed only to touch the unstable form (paroxetine anhydrate) with a microscopic "seed crystal" for the structure to be almost instantly transformed. When the patent for paroxetine anhydrate (the "original" polymorph) ran out, other companies wanted to make generic antidepressants using the chemical. The only problem was that by the time other companies began manufacturing, Earth's atmosphere was already seeded with microscopic quantities of paroxetine hemihydrate from GSK's manufacturing plants, which meant that anyone trying to manufacture the original polymorph would find it transformed into the still-copyrighted version, which GSK refused to give manufacturing rights for. As it is illegal to manufacture or sell anyone's patented product without their permission, GSK sued the Canadian generic pharmaceutical company Apotex for patent infringement by producing quantities of the newer paroxetine polymorph in their generic pills, asking for their products to be blocked from entering the market. GSK eventually lost the case on a technicality in the U.S. Federal Circuit Court, but many abstract legal questions were raised in the process which may not yet be fully resolved.

Ritonavir 
Released to the public in 1996, ritonavir is an antiretroviral medication used to help treat HIV/AIDS, and has been listed on the World Health Organization's List of Essential Medicines. The original medication was manufactured in the form of semisolid gel capsules, based on the only known crystal form of the drug ("Form I"). In 1998, however, a second crystal form ("Form II") was unexpectedly discovered, which had significantly lower solubility, and which wasn't medically effective. Form II was of sufficiently lower energy that it became impossible to produce Form I in any laboratory where Form II was introduced, even indirectly. Scientists who had been exposed to Form II in the past seemingly contaminated entire manufacturing plants by their presence, probably because they carried over microscopic seed crystals of the new polymorph. The drug was temporarily recalled from the market, and tens of thousands of AIDS patients went without medication for their condition, until ritonavir was reformulated, approved, and re-released to the market in 1999. It is estimated that Abbott, the company which produced ritonavir under the brand name Norvir, lost over $250 million USD as a result of the incident.

Rotigotine 
Rotigotine (sold under the brand name Neupro among others) is a dopamine agonist indicated for the treatment of Parkinson's disease (PD) and restless legs syndrome (RLS). In 2007, the Neupro patch was approved by the Food and Drug Administration (FDA) as the first transdermal patch treatment of Parkinson's disease in the United States. The drug had been established in 1980, and no prior polymorphism had been observed. In 2008, a more stable polymorph unexpectedly emerged, which was described as resembling "snow-like crystals". The new polymorph did not display any observable reduction in efficacy, but nonetheless, Schwarz Pharma recalled all Neupro patches in the United States and some in Europe. Those with remaining patches in Europe were  told to refrigerate their stock, since refrigeration seemed to reduce crystallization rates. The patch was reformulated in 2012, as per FDA recommendations, and was reintroduced in the United States without requiring refrigeration.

Progesterone 
Progesterone is a naturally occurring steroid hormone and is used in hormone therapy and birth control pills, among other applications. There are two known forms of naturally-occurring progesterone (or nat‐progesterone), and other synthetic polymorphs of the hormone have also been created and studied. Early scientists reported being able to crystallize both forms of nat‐progesterone, and could convert form 2 of into form 1 (which is more thermodynamically stable and melts at a different temperature). When later scientists tried to replicate the crystallization of form 2 from pure materials, they found themselves completely unable to do so. Attempts to replicate older instructions (and variations on those instructions) for crystallization of form 2 would invariably produce form 1 instead, sometimes even leading to crystals of exceptional purity—but of the wrong polymorph! Researchers have tentatively suggested that form 2 became gradually harder to produce around 1975, based on a review of production difficulties documented or alluded to in existing literature.

Form 2 was eventually successfully synthesized by using pregnenolone, a structurally similar compound, as an additive in the crystallization process. The additive seemed to overturn the order of stability of the polymorphs. Multiple theories were proposed for why earlier research was able to produce form 2 from "pure" ingredients, ranging from the possibility that the early researchers were unintentionally working with impure materials, to the possibility that seed crystals of form 1 had become more common in the atmosphere of laboratories since the 1970s.

Xylitol

Ranitidine

In fiction 
In the 1963 novel Cat's Cradle, by Kurt Vonnegut, the narrator learns about Ice-nine, an alternative structure of water that is solid at room temperature and acts as a seed crystal upon contact with ordinary liquid water, causing that liquid water to instantly freeze and transform into more ice-nine. Later in the book, a character frozen in ice-nine falls into the sea. Instantly, all the water in the world's seas, rivers, and groundwater transforms into solid ice-nine, leading to a climactic doomsday scenario.

Ice-nine has been described as an example of a disappearing polymorph in fiction.

See Also 

 Dynamical system
 Memetics
 Metastability
 Ostwald's Rule of Stages
 Prion
 Self-replicating machine
 Self-replication

References 

Polymorphism (materials science)
Chemistry in fiction